Thibault Klidjé (born 10 July 2001) is a Togolese professional footballer who plays as a forward for Swiss Super League club Luzern and the Togo national team.

Career
Klidjé began his career with the Togolese clubs Espoir Tsevie, and Gomido before signing with the reserves of French club Bordeaux on 21 February 2020.

On 31 August 2022, Klidjé signed for Swiss Super League club Luzern on a three-year contract.

International career
He debuted with the Togo national team on 9 October 2021 in a 1–1 World Cup qualifier draw against Congo.

References

External links
 
 
 

2001 births
Living people
Togolese footballers
Togo international footballers
Togo youth international footballers
Association football forwards
FC Girondins de Bordeaux players
FC Luzern players
Ligue 1 players
Championnat National 3 players
Togolese expatriate footballers
Togolese expatriate sportspeople in France
Togolese expatriate sportspeople in Switzerland
Expatriate footballers in France
Expatriate footballers in Switzerland
21st-century Togolese people